Peter Fleming and Anders Järryd were the defending champions, but Järryd did not participate this year.  Fleming partnered Anand Amritraj, losing in the first round.

Wojtek Fibak and Joakim Nyström won in the final 6–3, 7–6, against Christo Steyn and Danie Visser.

Seeds

  Wojtek Fibak /  Joakim Nyström (champions)
  Anand Amritraj /  Peter Fleming (first round)
  Amos Mansdorf /  Shahar Perkiss (first round)
  Mark Dickson /  Chris Dunk (semifinals)

Draw

Draw

External links
Draw

Toronto Indoor